Ahmed Tijani Mu'azu, OON, (born 6 September 1957), is a former acting chairman of Independent National Electoral Commission. He replaced Mahmood Yakubu on 9 November 2020 after his first tenure expired.

Education and career 
Mu'azu was born in Gombe, Gombe State. He had his education in Gombe State, Kaduna State and Borno State between 1964 and 1975. In June 1976, he joined the Nigerian Air Force where he had his basic military training at Nigerian Defence Academy till December 1979 and was commissioned pilot officer. From 1979 to 1991, he was deployed to air traffic control duties at the Murtala Muhammed International Airport and Mallam Aminu Kano International Airport. In 1988, Mu'azu did his junior command and staff course at Armed Forces Command and Staff College, Jaji. Between 1991 and 1992, he attended the senior command and staff course at Ghana Armed Forces Staff College, Teshie, Accra.

From 2003 to 2004, he was a member of National War College, Course 12 at the then National War College (now, National Defence College. In 2005, he received an MSc in strategic studies from University of Ibadan.

Mu’azu became an air vice marshal in 2007 and retired voluntarily in 2013. In 2016, he was appointed as a National Commissioner of Independent National Electoral Commission by the president of Nigeria, Muhammadu Buhari.

Acting INEC chairman 
On 9 November 2020, Mu'azu was appointed as the acting chairman of Independent National Electoral Commission to replace Mahmood Yakubu whose first tenure expired.

References 

People from Gombe State
University of Ibadan alumni
Nigerian Defence Academy alumni
Living people
1957 births
Nigerian Air Force air marshals
Nigerian Air Force officers
Members of the Independent National Electoral Commission